251 (two hundred [and] fifty-one) is the natural number between 250 and 252. It is also a prime number.

In mathematics
251 is:
a Sophie Germain prime.
the sum of three consecutive primes (79 + 83 + 89) and seven consecutive primes (23 + 29 + 31 + 37 + 41 + 43 + 47).
a Chen prime.
an Eisenstein prime with no imaginary part.
a de Polignac number, meaning that it is odd and cannot be formed by adding a power of two to a prime number.
the smallest number that can be formed in more than one way by summing three positive cubes:
Every 5 × 5 matrix has exactly 251 square submatrices.

References

Integers